This is a list of teams that once played in Major League Roller Hockey but no longer exist. This includes franchises which have relocated to different cities. The years of operation only reflect the time in which that team was in MLRH; it does not take into account any time in which the franchise operated in another league such as Roller Hockey International or the Professional Inline Hockey Association.

 Washington Power, 1997-1998
 New York Riot, 1997-1998
 Columbus Hawks, 1997-1998
 Buffalo Wings, 1997-1998
 Port Huron North Americans, 1997-1998
 Toronto Torpedoes, 1997-1998
 Pennsylvania Posse, 1997-1998
 Orlando Surge, 1997-1998
 Virginia Vultures, 1997-1998
 Tampa Bay Rollin' Thunder, 1997-1998
 South Carolina Fire Ants, 1997-1998
 Carolina Crushers, 1997-1998
 Dallas Hooligans, 2000
 Arlington Arrows, 2000
 Ft. Worth Wranglers, 2000
 Massachusetts Jokers
 Capital Crunch
 Colorado Crush
 Colorado Lightning
 D.C. Voltage
 Denver Devils
 Fairfax Falcons
 Hanford Gamas
 London Lions
 Marple Gladiators
 Mile High Hornets
 New Jersey Bullets
 New Jersey Wolfpac
 New Jersey Scorpions
 New Jersey Riot
 Philadelphia Thunder Cats
 Richmond Starz
 Rockey Mountain Wolverines
 Salt Lake Fire
 Williamsburg Warriors 
 Carolina Knights
 Hartford Thunder
 Boston Storm
 Philadelphia Gladiators
 Washington Mad Dogs
 Chicago RollerSnakes, 2005-2010
 Michigan Rebels, 2007
 New York Rockers, 2007
 Philadelphia Sting, 2007
 Ohio Wheelz, 2007
 Maryland Crush, 2007
 Virginia Wings, 2007
 DC Mad Dawgs, 2007
 Charlotte Outlawz, 2007
 Fredericksburg Sabres, 1999-2001

MLRH
Major League Roller Hockey